Víctor Mena may refer to:
Víctor Humberto Mena Dolmo (born 1980), Honduran footballer
Víctor Manuel Mena Coto (born 1995), Spanish footballer